Rev Sir James Marchant FRSE FLS FRAS KBE LLD (1867–1956) was a British eugenicist, social reformer and author. He was leader of the National Vigilance Association, concerned with social morality, and also the Director of the National Council of Public Morals. He epitomised the view of the priggish Victorian attitude to sex and morality.

Life

James Marchant was born in London on 18 December 1867.

Between 1889 and 1893, Marchant was a lecturer on Christian apologetics to the Bishop of St Albans and to the Christian Evidence Society.

In 1895, Marchant became a minister of an independent Congregational church in Plymouth. He went on to lead a Presbyterian church in north London before serving as an assistant minister to a Presbyterian church in Clapham.

In 1903, Marchant became clerical secretary to Dr Barnardo's Homes.

In 1913, Marchant was appointed secretary of the National Birth-rate Commission.

In 1917, Marchant was elected a Fellow of the Royal Society of Edinburgh. His proposers were Sir Thomas Clouston, Sir Alexander Russell Simpson, John Arthur Thomson and John William Ballantyne.

In 1921, Marchant was created a Knight of the Order of the British Empire by King George V for his work on birth-rate and contraception.

Marchant died at his home in Sherborne on 20 May 1956.

Family

In 1895, he married Eleanor Jane Gordon.

Publications
Theories of the Resurrection of Christ (1896)
Theories of the Person of Christ (1903)
Social Hygienics: A New Crusade (1909)
Aids to Purity (1909)
A Plea for Regeneration (1912)
The Cleansing of a City (1917)
The Master Problem (1917)
The Coming Renaissance (1923)
British Preachers (1927)
The Coming of Age of Christianity (1951)
The Censorship of Low Orade Literature
The Reunion of Christendom
The Life of Alfred Russel Wallace

References

External links

1867 births
1956 deaths
English non-fiction writers
British eugenicists